Marshon Demond Lattimore (born May 20, 1996) is an American football cornerback for the New Orleans Saints of the National Football League (NFL). He played college football at Ohio State, and was drafted by the Saints 11th overall in the 2017 NFL Draft.

Early years
Lattimore attended Glenville High School in Cleveland, Ohio. He played cornerback and wide receiver for the football team. As a senior, he was one of six finalists for the U.S. Army Player of the Year Award. Lattimore was rated as a four-star recruit and committed to Ohio State University to play college football.

College career
Lattimore redshirted his first year at Ohio State in 2014 and played in only seven games his redshirt freshman year in 2015, due to hamstring injuries. He fully recovered from the injuries to become a starter in 2016. On November 29, 2016, Lattimore was named First-team All-Big Ten by the coaches.

Professional career
Coming out of Ohio State, Lattimore was projected to be a first round pick by the majority of NFL experts and analysts. He was invited to the NFL Combine, but chose not to perform the bench press, shuttle, and three-cone drill. He attended Ohio State's Pro Day and decided to only run positional drills for scouts and representatives. Although he had a history of hamstring injuries and was limited to a single year of starting experience in college, he was ranked the top cornerback prospect in the draft by NFLDraftScout.com, Sports Illustrated, ESPN, NFL analyst Bucky Brooks, and NFL analyst Mike Mayock. Lattimore was also ranked as the best cornerback by Pro Football Focus.

The New Orleans Saints selected Lattimore in the first round (11th overall) of the 2017 NFL Draft. He was the first of five cornerbacks selected in the first round of the draft.

2017 season
On June 3, 2017, the Saints signed Lattimore to a fully guaranteed four-year, $15.35 million contract with a signing bonus of $9.31 million.

The Saints were expected to bring Lattimore along slowly and allow him to sit behind starters Delvin Breaux and P. J. Williams and compete for the role as the third cornerback on the depth chart against Ken Crawley and De'Vante Harris. Head coach Sean Payton named him the third cornerback behind P. J. Williams and Ken Crawley after Breaux suffered a fractured fibula on August 16. He started the first two regular-season games after Crawley was listed as inactive for both.
 
Lattimore made his NFL debut on Monday Night Football in the season-opener against the Minnesota Vikings and recorded four solo tackles in the 29–19 loss. The following week, he had a season-high seven combined tackles, two pass deflections, and a forced fumble during a 36–20 loss against the New England Patriots. Lattimore left the game in the fourth quarter and was placed in concussion protocol after colliding with teammate Vonn Bell as they both tackled wide receiver Brandin Cooks. Lattimore became the starting cornerback prior to Week 4 after Williams was demoted in relation with a disciplinary issue. Two weeks later against the Detroit Lions, Lattimore recorded five combined tackles, deflected two passes, intercepted a pass attempt from quarterback Matthew Stafford, and returned it for a 27-yard touchdown during a 52–38 victory. The interception and touchdown were the first of his career. On November 2, 2017, he was named the NFC Defensive Rookie of the Month for the month of October. Lattimore missed Weeks 12–13 due to an ankle sprain during a Week 11 victory over the Washington Redskins.

On December 21, it was announced that Lattimore was selected to play in the 2018 Pro Bowl. During Week 16, he made five combined tackles, four pass deflections, and intercepted his fifth pass of the year off of Matt Ryan in a 23–13 victory over the Atlanta Falcons.

Lattimore finished his rookie year with 52 combined tackles (43 solo), 18 pass deflections, five interceptions, and a touchdown in 13 games and starts. His five interceptions were the fifth most of all players in 2017. Lattimore was named the NFL Defensive Rookie of the Year and received an overall grade of 90.5 from Pro Football Focus and had the fourth highest grade among all cornerbacks in 2017. He was ranked 82nd by his peers on the NFL Top 100 Players of 2018, one of three rookies to make the list.

The Saints finished atop the NFC South with an 11–5 record. On January 7, 2018, Lattimore started his first NFL playoff game and recorded two solo tackles and a pass deflection during a 31–26 NFC Wild Card round victory over the Carolina Panthers. The following week, he made four solo tackles and deflected a pass in a 29–24 road loss to the Vikings in the NFC Divisional round, which became known as the Minneapolis Miracle.

2018 season
In the season-opener against the Tampa Bay Buccaneers, Lattimore primarily covered wide receiver Mike Evans, who caught seven passes for 147 yards including a 50-yard touchdown. Due to the Saints' poor play on defense, they lost by a score of 48–40. After the game, Lattimore stated: "It isn't going to get me down. Everybody gets beat. We needed to get slapped in our face one good time to see we're not on a level we think we're on." During Week 11 against the Philadelphia Eagles, he made his first interception of the season off of Carson Wentz in a 48–7 victory. Two weeks later against the Dallas Cowboys, Lattimore forced Amari Cooper to fumble the ball and recovered it. After the play, Lattimore put $23 into the Salvation Army's Red Kettle by the endzone as the Saints lost 13–10. Two weeks later against the Tampa Bay Buccaneers, Lattimore intercepted Jameis Winston in the endzone and forced a fumble off Chris Godwin in a 28–14 road victory.

Lattimore finished his second professional season with 59 combined tackles, 12 pass deflections, two interceptions, four forced fumbles, and three fumble recoveries in 16 games and starts. He received an overall grade of 74.1 from Pro Football Focus in 2018, which ranked as the 20th highest grade among all qualifying corner backs.

The Saints finished atop the NFC South with a 13–3 record and were the no. 1 seed in the NFC for the playoffs. In the Divisional Round of the playoffs against the Eagles, Lattimore made two interceptions off of Nick Foles in the 20–14 win. The first came in the second quarter when Lattimore picked off a pass that was intended for tight end Zach Ertz and the second occurred in the fourth quarter when wide receiver Alshon Jeffery dropped a pass that fell into his waiting hands, sealing a Saints win as the Eagles' offense never got the ball back. In the NFC Championship game against the Los Angeles Rams, Lattimore made six tackles in the controversial 26–23 overtime loss.

2019 season
During Week 3 against the Seattle Seahawks, Lattimore recorded a team high 12 tackles in a 33–27 road victory. Three weeks later against the Jacksonville Jaguars, he recorded his first interception of the season off of Gardner Minshew in the 13–6 road victory.

Lattimore was named to his second Pro Bowl, though he declined the invitation due to injury.

2020 season
In Week 5 against the Los Angeles Chargers on Monday Night Football, Lattimore recorded the game winning tackle on wide receiver Mike Williams short of the first down marker on fourth down during the 30–27 overtime win.
In Week 8 against the Chicago Bears, Lattimore recorded his first interception of the season off a pass thrown by Nick Foles during the 26–23 overtime win.

2021 season

On September 12, 2021, Lattimore signed a five-year, $97.6 million contract extension with the Saints.

In Week 5, Lattimore had six passes defensed in a 33–22 win over Washington, earning NFC Defensive Player of the Week.

2022 season
In Week 2 against the Tampa Bay Buccaneers, Lattimore was ejected after getting into a fight with Mike Evans in the fourth quarter in the 10-20 loss. Lattimore was shoved to the turf from Evans after Lattimore exchanged words with Tom Brady and being shoved by Leonard Fournette.

Lattimore suffered a lacerated kidney during a Week 5 matchup against the Seattle Seahawks and did not return until Week 17.

Legal issues
On March 25, 2021, Lattimore was arrested for possession of a loaded handgun that was believed to be stolen, and was charged with possession of a concealed weapon and receiving stolen property, a fourth-degree felony. He was booked into Cuyahoga County Jail with bond set at $5,000.

NFL career statistics

Regular season

Postseason

References

External links

 Ohio State Buckeyes bio
 New Orleans Saints bio
 

1996 births
Living people
American football cornerbacks
New Orleans Saints players
Ohio State Buckeyes football players
Players of American football from Cleveland
National Conference Pro Bowl players
National Football League Defensive Rookie of the Year Award winners